Auken is a surname. Notable people with the surname include:

Ida Auken, Danish politician
Kirsten Auken, Danish politician
Margrete Auken, Danish politician
Sabine Auken, German bridge player
Svend Auken, Danish politician

See also
Auke (name)
Van Auken (disambiguation)